Radio Amor is the second studio album by Canadian electronic music musician Tim Hecker, released on March 25, 2003 on Mille Plateaux, and re-released on Alien8 Recordings on January 23, 2007.

Track listing

References

2003 albums
Tim Hecker albums
Alien8 Recordings albums